Ruellia villosa (syn. Siphonacanthus villosus Nees) is a plant native to the Cerrado vegetation of Brazil. This plant is cited in Flora Brasiliensis by Carl Friedrich Philipp von Martius.

External links
Flora Brasiliensis: Siphonacanthus villosus

villosa
Flora of Brazil